Midnight is a 1982 American exploitation horror film directed by John Russo and starring Melanie Verlin, Lawrence Tierney, and John Amplas. Its plot follows a female hitchhiker en route to San Francisco who finds herself at the mercy of a backwoods Satanic cult in Pennsylvania who sacrifice young women in an attempt to resurrect their dead mother. It is based on Russo's 1980 novel of the same name, published by Pocket Books.

The film was shot on location outside Pittsburgh, Pennsylvania, and features special effects by Tom Savini. The film was released theatrically by Independent International Pictures in 1982. While not prosecuted for obscenity, the film was seized and confiscated in the UK under Section 3 of the Obscene Publications Act 1959 during the video nasty panic  The film was re-released in 1985 under the alternate title The Backwoods Massacre.

Plot
In rural Pennsylvania, a young girl screams for help in a rural meadow, her leg caught in an animal trap. A group of children, along with an older woman they call Mama, arrive, and one of the boys, Abraham, knocks the girl unconscious. Later, the children chant a Satanic prayer over the girl at the behest of their mother, and one of the children, Cynthia, proceeds to brutally stab her to death with a dagger.

Years later, teenaged Nancy Johnson runs away from her home after her stepfather Bert, a police officer, attempts to rape her. While hitchhiking to her sister's home in San Francisco, she is picked up by two benevolent young men, Hank and Tom. In the backwoods, they pick up a Baptist preacher and his adult daughter, Sandra, who they drop off at a cemetery to visit the grave of the preacher's wife. Sandra says a prayer and heads back toward their house; her father remains, and is stabbed to death by a man with a machete. Later, Sandra finds her father's corpse on their doorstep, and is also murdered by the man with the machete.

At a local bar, Tom, Hank, and Nancy encounter racists who refuse to serve them because Hank is African-American. Short on money, they steal groceries from a small market and are chased by two local police officers. They lose the police by driving onto a dirt road into the woods. Upon stopping, they witness a man in the woods carrying a large object draped with a sheet. Not wanting to be caught by police, they ultimately decide to camp in the woods overnight.

In the morning, Nancy goes for a walk, and returns to the campsite to witness two police officers, Luke and Abraham, arresting Hank and Tom, accusing them of murdering a local woman. The police shoot Hank and Tom to death execution style, and then pursue Nancy, who flees into the woods. She comes across a farmhouse, and inside finds a teenage girl, Cynthia, playing cards. She asks for a phone, and is directed to another room; when she enters, she finds the man she, Tom, and Hank saw earlier (whom she comes to find is named Cyrus) dismembering two corpses. She is confronted by the two officers, who lock her in an animal cage next to another victim, Gwen. In conversation, Gwen recounts how Luke and Abraham murdered two police officers the night before and stole their uniforms. Luke, Abraham, and Cyrus return to the campsite and burn the bodies of Hank and Tom. Later, Luke goes upstairs and has a conversation with his dead mother, a decomposed corpse the family keeps in a bed.

Meanwhile, Bert reports Nancy missing and begins searching for her himself. At the farmhouse, the family conduct a Black Mass at midnight and sacrifice Sharon, another local woman they have kidnapped, in the name of Satan. Observing the mass from a cage, Nancy prays to God as they slit Sharon's throat before feeding her blood to their dead mother, attempting to resurrect her. Luke and Abraham drive Sharon's body to a field the next morning and begin digging a shallow grave, an event witnessed by Bert, who stumbles upon the scene; he hears them discuss sacrificing Nancy and Gwen on Easter.

At their next Black Mass, Cynthia sacrifices Gwen, while Nancy quietly recites the Lord's Prayer. This time, Luke drinks Gwen's blood himself. After the mass, Luke prepares to bring Gwen's body outside, but is accosted by Bert, who clobbers him. Bert holds Abraham and Cyrus at gunpoint, and forces Abraham to retrieve Nancy. Just as Nancy is brought outside, Cynthia attacks Bert, stabbing him to death. As he collapses, his gun discharges, shooting and killing both Cyrus and Abraham. Nancy flees into a barn and is chased by Cynthia, but Nancy manages to overpower her and slash her throat with a sickle. Nancy proceeds to pour gasoline on Luke, who has regained consciousness, and lights him on fire. Traumatized, she collapses against a shed and watches Luke burn to death.

Cast

Production
Midnight was filmed on location outside Pittsburgh, Pennsylvania in 1981 on a budget of $200,000. Tom Savini supplied the film's special effects.

Release
Midnight received a theatrical release through Independent-Internation, opening regionally in Tallahassee, Florida on May 28, 1982. It continued to screen in various U.S. cities, opening in Nashville, Tennessee on June 11, 1982.

In 1985, the film was re-released under the alternate title The Backwoods Massacre.

Critical response
Jim Davidson of The Pittsburgh Press wrote: "As horror movies go, this one has two major failings. It's not scary, and it lacks a sense of humor." He added that the film's black mass sequences are "grave and heavy-handed. Russo isn't doing Grand Guignol; he isn't spoofing satanism or catering to an audience that enjoys silliness and artificiality of horror movies."

In 1993, Sight and Sound referred to the film as a "mediocre shocker". Film scholar Scott Aaron Stine called the film an "adeptly made low budget horror film, despite the simple arithmetic involved," and likened it to The Texas Chain Saw Massacre (1974). Tom Writer of Cinefantastique noted: "John Russo, whose solo filmmaking efforts have never come close to equaling his collaborative work with George Romero on NIGHT OF THE LIVING DEAD, deserves praise for this ambitious, low-budget film made in Pittsburgh."

Home media
The film was released on VHS by Vidmark Entertainment, and sold approximately $1 million worth of video cassettes. In 2005, the film was released on DVD by Lionsgate Home Video, before receiving a region-free DVD release in the United Kingdom by Arrow Films in 2011. It received a Blu-ray release from Severin Films in September 2021.

References

Sources

External links
 
 

1982 films
1982 horror films
1980s exploitation films
American exploitation films
American slasher films
Films about cults
Films about racism
Films about Satanism
Films based on American horror novels
Films shot in Pittsburgh
1980s slasher films
1980s English-language films
1980s American films